The Hawking Index (HI) is a mock mathematical measure on how far people will, on average, read through a book before giving up. It was invented by American mathematician Jordan Ellenberg, who created it in a blog for the Wall Street Journal in 2014. The index is named after English physicist Stephen Hawking, whose book A Brief History of Time has been dubbed "the most unread book of all time".

Calculation
Ellenberg's method of calculating the index draws on the "popular highlights", the five most highlighted passages marked by Amazon Kindle readers of each title. A wide spread of highlights throughout the work means that most readers will have read the entire book, resulting in a high on the index. If the spread of highlights occurs only at the beginning of the book, then it means that fewer people will have read the book completely and it will thus score low on the index. When the index was created, this information was easier to access, as "popular highlights" were available to everyone, but since then this information has only been made available to people who buy the books on Kindle.

Hawking Index scores
When Ellenberg first used the index, he used the following books as his examples.

References

Literature
Units of measurement